Iwan Rheon (born 13 May 1985) is a Welsh actor, singer, and musician. He is best known for his roles as Simon Bellamy in the E4 series Misfits, Ramsay Bolton in the HBO series Game of Thrones, and Mötley Crüe guitarist Mick Mars in the film  The Dirt. He has also appeared in the series Vicious,  Riviera, and Inhumans.

Early life
Rheon was born in Carmarthen on 13 May 1985, the son of Einir and Rheon Tomos. When he was five years old, his family moved to Cardiff. His older brother, Aled, is a musician; the two performed together on the 2015 single "Rhodd". Rheon attended Ysgol Gyfun Gymraeg Glantaf, a Welsh-speaking school, where he began acting in school drama productions at age 17. He was later spotted by a talent scout at a National Eisteddfod of Wales.

Career

Acting

At age 17, Rheon joined the Welsh language soap Pobol Y Cwm, in which he originated the role of Macsen White, but later left to train at the London Academy of Music and Dramatic Art. His first notable stage part came in Eight Miles High, which was staged in 2008 at the Royal Court Theatre in Liverpool. Also in 2008, he was cast as the haunted Moritz Stiefel in the London production of the Tony Award-winning rock musical Spring Awakening. He played this role from January 2009 at the Lyric Hammersmith and continued when the show was transferred to the Novello Theatre, until it closed in May 2009, five months earlier than planned. He earned a What's on Stage Award nomination for Best Supporting Actor in a Musical, which was eventually won by Oliver Thornton (Priscilla Queen of the Desert). For his performance he won the award for Best Supporting Actor in a Musical at the 2010 Olivier Awards.

Immediately after Spring Awakening, Rheon was cast in the E4 channel's Misfits, a BAFTA winning programme that was described by 247 Magazine as "a mix of Skins and Heroes". He plays nervous, shy Simon Bellamy, who gains the superpower of invisibility and precognition in season 3. On 20 December 2011, Rheon announced via Twitter that he had left the show, along with fellow cast member Antonia Thomas.

In 2011, he also appeared in the final episode of Secret Diary of a Call Girl. In 2011, he was nominated for a Golden Nymph in the "Outstanding Actor – Drama Series" category for his role in Misfits. Rheon also made two guest appearances as the character Ben Theodore in Simon Amstell's comedy Grandma's House. In early 2012, Rheon filmed the crime heist drama The Rise. In spring 2012, he began shooting Libertador in Venezuela and Spain. He plays Daniel O'Leary. In May 2012, it was announced that he had signed on to the gritty drama Driven. In 2013, Rheon was cast as the villainous psychopath Ramsay Bolton in the HBO series Game of Thrones. In the DVD commentary for the series' third season, producers David Benioff and D.B. Weiss mentioned that Rheon previously auditioned for the role of Jon Snow, but lost to Kit Harington, with whom Rheon maintains a close friendship. He portrayed Ash Weston in the ITV sitcom Vicious from 2013 until 2016.

In 2013, Rheon played a lead role in the philosophical radio play, Darkside, based on the themes of Pink Floyd's The Dark Side of the Moon album. In September 2014, Rheon joined the cast of BBC One's Our Girl as Dylan "Smurf" Smith. In 2017, it was announced that Rheon had been cast in ABC's Inhumans series. Rheon played Mötley Crüe guitarist Mick Mars in the 2019 film The Dirt.

Music
Songwriting and singing since the age of 16, Rheon was lead singer in The Convictions until leaving the band to pursue his acting career. In 2010, he recorded his first solo work, Tongue Tied EP, at RAK Studios in London, produced by Jonathan Quarmby and Kevin Bacon. The EP, a four track release with acoustic guitar and voice, was released digitally in June 2010.

He returned to RAK Studios, in April 2011, to record his second EP Changing Times, again produced by Quarmby and Bacon, with the addition of three backing musicians. Changing Times was released on 10 October 2011. On 7 April 2013, Rheon released his third EP Bang! Bang! and on 9 April 2013, released the music video for the title track.

Rheon recorded his first album, Dinard, at RAK Studios in London and Tŷ Cerdd Studios in Wales. The album was released in April 2015 and produced by James Clarke and Jim Unwin. A "self-funded collection of emotive folk-pop songs recorded over several years", the album's title refers to Dinard, a town in Brittany, France, where Rheon met his girlfriend Zoë Grisedale. Music journalist Neil McCormick described the album as "an absorbing collection of moody, introspective songs, all written by Rheon, who plays acoustic guitar with a deft touch and sings in an expressive, gritty voice".

Personal life
Rheon is fluent in both Welsh and English, with Welsh being his first language. He lives in London and has a son, born in August 2018. His son's mother is Zoë Grisedale.

Filmography

Film

Television

Radio and audiobook

Video games

Stage

Discography

EPs
 Tongue Tied EP (2010)
 Changing Times EP (2011)
 Bang, Bang! EP (2013)

Studio albums
 Dinard (2015)

Awards and nominations

References

External links

 Official website
 

1985 births
Welsh-speaking actors
Welsh-speaking musicians
Welsh male stage actors
Welsh male television actors
Welsh male film actors
21st-century Welsh male singers
Welsh operatic baritones
Welsh singer-songwriters
Laurence Olivier Award winners
21st-century Welsh male actors
Male actors from Cardiff
People educated at Ysgol Gyfun Gymraeg Glantaf
Alumni of the London Academy of Music and Dramatic Art
Living people
Musicians from Cardiff
Actors with dyslexia